John Fogerty is the second solo studio album by former Creedence Clearwater Revival vocalist/guitarist John Fogerty, released in 1975. It was released by Asylum Records in the United States and Fantasy Records internationally. As with the Creedence Clearwater Revival records, the album consists of a mix of originals and cover songs. Although the album is eponymously titled, Fogerty himself refers to it as "Old Shep"; Shep was the name of his dog, who appears on the cover with him.

The song "Rockin' All Over the World" was covered by the band Status Quo in 1977, becoming one of their most recognizable songs, while Dave Edmunds made his cover of "Almost Saturday Night" one of his staple songs.

Track listing
All tracks written and composed by John Fogerty, except where noted.
Side 1
"Rockin' All Over the World" – 2:56
"You Rascal You" (Sam Theard) – 2:42
"The Wall" – 2:59
"Travelin' High" – 3:20
"Lonely Teardrops" (Tyran Carlo, Gwen Fuqua, Berry Gordy, Jr.) – 4:30
Side 2
"Almost Saturday Night" – 2:32
"Where the River Flows" – 2:34
"Sea Cruise" (Huey "Piano" Smith) – 3:18
"Dream/Song" – 3:13
"Flyin' Away" – 4:23

References

1975 albums
Albums produced by John Fogerty
Asylum Records albums
Fantasy Records albums
John Fogerty albums